Chris Drake (born James Christian Droste, December 11, 1923 – July 9, 2006) was an American actor best known for his co-star role of the 1950s television series Sheena, Queen of the Jungle, in which he co-starred with Irish McCalla.

Early life

Drake was born as James C. Droste near Richmond, Virginia. He traced his family's roots in Virginia back to 1638. When he was 10 years old, he moved with his family to California, after his father had developed an incurable skin condition. They settled in Manhattan Beach. Drake graduated from El Segundo High School.

During World War II Drake joined the United States Marine Corps. As one of Carlson's Raiders at Guadalcanal, Drake was wounded enough that he spent 11 months in eight Naval hospitals. He received two presidential citations for gallantry and a Purple Heart.

Career 
After he played a bit part in an RKO film, the studio signed Drake to a long-term contract. He had the leading role in the film Forever My Love. He also co-starred in the 1954 Sci-Fi film Them! and appeared on such television series as Lassie, Stories of the Century (as Burt Alvord), Dragnet, and The Lone Ranger.

Following his acting career, he sold real estate in California, owning wholly or a portion of 11 real estate offices in and around Palos Verdes, until 1990. He retired two years later to his native Virginia, where he died in 2006, aged 82.

References
 
 Ultra Filmfax   April 1988, Iss.66, pg. 79–82, by Charles P. Mitchell, "Christian Drake, Sheena Days with White Hunter Bob"

External links

1923 births
2006 deaths
American male film actors
American male television actors
United States Marine Corps personnel of World War II
United States Marines
Male actors from Richmond, Virginia
Military personnel from Richmond, Virginia
RKO Pictures contract players
20th-century American male actors
El Segundo High School alumni